The 2014–15 Idaho State Bengals men's basketball team represented Idaho State University during the 2014–15 NCAA Division I men's basketball season. The Bengals, led by third year head coach Bill Evans, played ten of their home games at Holt Arena and five home games at Reed Gym. They were members of the Big Sky Conference. They finished the season 7–23, 4–14 in Big Sky play to finish in a three way tie for tenth place. They failed to qualify for the Big Sky tournament.

Roster

Schedule

|-
!colspan=9 style="background:#000000; color:#FF8300;"| Exhibition

|-
!colspan=9 style="background:#000000; color:#FF8300;"| Regular season

References

Idaho State Bengals men's basketball seasons
Idaho State
IIdaho
IIdaho